Acraea abdera, the Abdera acraea, is a butterfly in the family Nymphalidae. It is found in Sierra Leone, Liberia, Ivory Coast, Ghana, Togo, Nigeria, Cameroon, Equatorial Guinea, Sudan, Uganda and the Republic of the Congo .

Description
Very close to Acraea cepheus qv.

Subspecies
Acraea abdera abdera (eastern Nigeria, Cameroon, Bioko, Sudan, Uganda)
Acraea abdera eginopsis Aurivillius, 1899 (Sierra Leone, Liberia, Ivory Coast, Ghana, Togo, western Nigeria)

Biology
The habitat consists of forest edges.

Both sexes mud-puddle in hot, dry weather.

The larvae feed on Caloncoba gilgiana, Caloncoba glauca and Oncoba spinosa.

Taxonomy
It is a member of the Acraea cepheus species group. See also Pierre & Bernaud, 2014

References

External links

 Images at Bold
Acraea abdera abdera and Acraea abdera eginopsis at Pteron

Butterflies described in 1852
abdera